The 2020–21 TFF First League was the 20th season since the league was established in 2001 and 58th season of the second-level football league of Turkey since its establishment in 1963–64. There was no relegation to or from the TFF First League the prior year due to the Coronavirus Pandemic.

Teams
Hatayspor, BB Erzurumspor and Fatih Karagümrük promoted to 2020–21 Süper Lig.
Bandırmaspor, Samsunspor and Tuzlaspor promoted from TFF Second League.
The bottom three teams will be relegated to the TFF Second League.

Stadiums and locations

Personnel and sponsorship

League table
<onlyinclude>

Positions by round
The table lists the positions of teams after each week of matches. In order to preserve chronological evolvements, any postponed matches are not included to the round at which they were originally scheduled, but added to the full round they were played immediately afterwards.

Results

Promotion Playoffs

Semifinals

|}

First leg
 

Second leg

Final

|}

Top goalscorers

References

External links 
  Turkish Football Federation PTT 1. League

Turkey
TFF First League seasons
2020–21 in Turkish football